is a Japanese basketball player for Denso Iris and the Japanese national team. She competed at the 2020 Summer Olympics, winning a silver medal.

Career 
She participated at the 2018 FIBA Women's Basketball World Cup.

References

External links

1998 births
Living people
Basketball players at the 2020 Summer Olympics
Japanese women's basketball players
Olympic basketball players of Japan
Shooting guards
Sportspeople from Ishikawa Prefecture
Olympic medalists in basketball
Olympic silver medalists for Japan
Medalists at the 2020 Summer Olympics
21st-century Japanese women